Trichura fumida is a moth in the subfamily Arctiinae. It was described by William James Kaye in 1914. It is found in Trinidad.

References

Moths described in 1914
Arctiini